André Desvages (12 March 1944 – 1 June 2018) was a French professional road bicycle racer.  His sporting career began with C.S.M. Puteaux. Desvages' short professional cycling career, from 1967 to 1970, is mostly remembered for his 5A stage win in the 1968 Tour de France. After his cycling career he became technical director of the new Gitane team, and he signed a young Bernard Hinault. He competed in the team time trial at the 1964 Summer Olympics.

Major results

1965
Paris - Troyes
1968
Tour de France:
Winner stage 5A

References

External links
 
 Official Tour de France results for André Desvages

1944 births
2018 deaths
French male cyclists
French Tour de France stage winners
Sportspeople from Calvados (department)
Olympic cyclists of France
Cyclists at the 1964 Summer Olympics
Cyclists from Normandy